Goodbye Stranger is a 2015 young adult realistic fiction novel written by Rebecca Stead that details the social and personal challenges facing modern middle school students.

Plot summary
The novel, set in New York City, is told from two intertwining perspectives. The first follows the set of friends "who drew creatures on their homework" and initially met in fourth grade, who are now entering seventh grade. Bridget "Bridge" Barsamian (who draws a three-eyed Martian) was involved in a serious accident and missed her third grade year while in the hospital; she starts hanging out with Sherm Russo, another seventh grader in Tech Crew, the school's stagehand organization. Tabitha "Tab" Patel (who draws a funny bird) becomes involved with the Human Rights Club at school. Emily "Em" (no surname given, who draws a spotted snake) is athletic and is starting to attract attention from boys.

In the second, an unnamed student ditches school and avoids her friends on Valentine's Day. It is clear the student knows the first group and lives in the same neighborhood, but her identity is kept a mystery through much of the novel.

Development
Stead said in 2015 that "Goodbye Stranger came from my thinking about and observing middle-school girls and the intense pressure they are under. It’s an interesting stage of life. Kids are changing so quickly, intellectually and physically, and have so many complicated questions about their identity, about how they see themselves, how others see them, and how they want to be seen." Bridge wears cat ears because of a chance encounter Stead had with a stranger in the street: "The idea came from a girl. She was wearing cat ears. And I said, 'Nice ears.' And she said, 'Thanks, I've been wearing them for a year. I don't know why.' And then she ran away."

Publication history

Reception
Meg Wolitzer, reviewing for The New York Times, said the novel "sensitively explores togetherness, aloneness, betrayal and love" and the second storyline "succeeds as a cautionary tale that signals what may lie ahead for the younger girls."

Awards
Goodbye Stranger received a 2016 Boston Globe–Horn Book Fiction Honor Award. National Public Radio named the novel to its 2015 list of Great Reads. School Library Journal named the novel to one of its Best Books of 2015. Booklist made the novel an Editors' Choice in 2015.

See also
 The Kind of Friends We Used to Be (2009), by Frances O'Roark Dowell
 33 Minutes (2013), by Todd Hasak-Lowy

References

External links

Reviews
 
 
 
 
 
 

2015 American novels
American children's novels
2015 children's books
Novels set in New York City
Wendy Lamb Books books